American Water may refer to:

 American Water (album)
 American Water (company)
 American Water Works Association
 American Water Resources Association